JS Atago (DDG-177), is the lead ship of her class of guided missile destroyer in the Japan Maritime Self-Defense Force (JMSDF). She was named after Mount Atago. She was laid down by Mitsubishi Heavy Industries in Nagasaki on April 5, 2004. Launching ceremony happened on August 24, 2005 and she was commissioned on March 15, 2007.

Deployments
JS Atago took part in RIMPAC 2010 held in Hawaii.

On February 19 (JST, February 18-UTC), 2008, Atago collided with and destroyed a civil fishing boat. Two fishermen were missing, and they have not been found. Two of Atago's crewmen who had been prosecuted with the charges of professional negligence after the accident were found not guilty.

Gallery

References

External links

DDG 7,700 ton Class

Atago-class destroyers
Maritime incidents in 2008
2005 ships
Ships built by Mitsubishi Heavy Industries